The British Journal of Psychiatry is a peer-reviewed medical journal covering all branches of psychiatry with a particular emphasis on the clinical aspects of each topic.

The journal is owned by the Royal College of Psychiatrists and published monthly by Cambridge University Press on behalf of the college. The journal publishes original research papers from around the world as well as editorials, review articles, commentaries on contentious articles, short reports, a comprehensive book review section and correspondence column. The editor-in-chief is Professor Kamaldeep Bhui. The complete archive of contents from 1855 to the present is available online. All content from January 2000 on is made freely available 1 year after publication.

History 
The journal was established in 1853 as the Asylum Journal, changing title in 1855 to the Asylum Journal of Mental Science and changing title again to Journal of Mental Science from 1858 to 1963, when it obtained its present name.

Reception 
According to the Journal Citation Reports, the journal has a 2018 impact factor of 7.233.

See also 
 List of psychiatry journals

References

External links
 

English-language journals
Psychiatry journals
Publications established in 1853
Monthly journals
Mental health in the United Kingdom
Academic journals published by learned and professional societies of the United Kingdom
Cambridge University Press academic journals